Kikkerachtbaan (Frog Roller Coaster) is a steel roller coaster in the Dutch amusement park Duinrell, which was opened in 1985, it was one of the first attractions in Duinrell.

Information
It was built by the German manufacturer Zierer which is located in Deggendorf.
The capacity of the roller coaster amounts to about 1250 persons per hour. Children are allowed from a height of 1,20 meter  unaccompanied in the attraction. Smaller children only if an adult (parent) accompanies them.

The train of this roller coaster consists of 20 vehicles, each car has two seating areas per person, which amounts to a maximum of 40 people per trip. It has one train. On the top of the front carriage of the train, mascot Rick the Frog depicted with his hands folded where his chin rests.

External links
 Kikkerachtbaan at Duinrell.com

References

 Info sources at rcdb.com

Roller coasters in the Netherlands
Roller coasters introduced in 1985
1985 establishments in the Netherlands